Azéde Jean-Pierre is a Haitian-American fashion designer.

Biography
Jean-Pierre was born in Pestel, Haiti and emigrated to the United States at the age of six, where she grew up in Atlanta, Georgia and attended Savannah College of Art and Design.

Career
Jean-Pierre debuted her line in 2012. She is most-known for designing outfits for Michelle Obama and for her Essence Magazine cover. Jean-Pierre has also had designs worn by Naomi Campbell, Solange Knowles, and Lady Gaga.

In 2016, Jean-Pierre has appeared in the Forbes 30 Under 30.

References

African-American designers
American fashion designers
People from Atlanta
Savannah College of Art and Design alumni
Haitian emigrants to the United States
Year of birth missing (living people)
Living people